Cteniogaster is a genus of spiders in the family Liocranidae. It was first described in 2013 by Bosselaers & Jocqué. , it contains 7 African species.

Species
Cteniogaster comprises the following species:
Cteniogaster conviva Bosselaers & Jocqué, 2013
Cteniogaster hexomma Bosselaers & Jocqué, 2013
Cteniogaster lampropus Bosselaers & Jocqué, 2013
Cteniogaster nana Bosselaers & Jocqué, 2013
Cteniogaster sangarawe Bosselaers & Jocqué, 2013
Cteniogaster taxorchis Bosselaers & Jocqué, 2013
Cteniogaster toxarchus Bosselaers & Jocqué, 2013

References

Liocranidae
Araneomorphae genera
Spiders of Africa